Jamush Olan, also rendered as Gavmish Owlan, may refer to:
 Jamush Olan-e Olya
 Jamush Olan-e Sofla